Chaining is a teaching procedure. It may also refer to:

 Chaining (vector processing)
 Method chaining
 Forward chaining
 Backward chaining
 Back-chaining
 Exception chaining
 New York City Subway chaining
 Daisy chaining DNA
 Skill chaining
 Separate chaining
 Index chaining -- the calculation of price or quantity indexes by computing all intermediate period-to-period changes

See also
 Chain
 Chain (disambiguation)